Roman Bečvář (born 18 April 1989) is a Czech handball player for TuS Nettelstedt-Lübbecke and the Czech national team.

He participated at the 2018 European Men's Handball Championship.

References

1989 births
Living people
Czech male handball players
Expatriate handball players
Czech expatriate sportspeople in Germany
TuS Nettelstedt-Lübbecke players
Sportspeople from Plzeň